Beatrice Alda is an American actress and filmmaker who appeared in The Four Seasons and Men of Respect.

Career 
Alda played Lisa in the 1981 film, The Four Seasons, directed by her father, and reprised the role in the 1984 television series of the same name. She played Judy, the daughter of Steve, played by her real life father, in the 1988 film A New Life.

Alda and her wife filmmaker Jennifer Brooke co-directed and produced the 2008 documentary film Out Late, which follows the lives of people who came out as gay, lesbian, and transgender while they were senior citizens. They also co-directed and produced the 2016 documentary Legs: a Big Issue in a Small Town about a controversy surrounding a giant Larry Rivers sculpture in a small American town.

Personal life
Alda is the daughter of actor Alan Alda and author and photographer Arlene Weiss. Her sisters are Eve and actress Elizabeth Alda. Alda has four children with wife Jennifer Brooke.

Filmography

Acting

Film

Television

Filmmaker Credits

References

External links

Living people
Actresses from New York City
American film actresses
American people of Irish descent
American people of Italian descent
Jewish American actresses
American LGBT actors
21st-century American Jews
21st-century American LGBT people
21st-century American women
Year of birth missing (living people)